Highway 365 is a provincial highway in the Canadian province of Saskatchewan. It connects Highway 2 in the town of Watrous, Manitou Beach regional park, to Highway 16 at Plunkett.

Route description
Highway 365 follows Range Road 252 from Watrous at Highway 2 and travels north towards Manitou Beach. Highway 365 is a narrow, paved two-lane road for most of its length. However, it has not been maintained well, as crude road repairs, potholes, and mud sections are common north of Manitou.

The Manitou Beach town site is at km 6; this section may cause confusion among drivers unfamiliar with the town's layout, as no Highway 365 signage is posted in this area, and there are many opportunities to accidentally exit the actual highway. It turns east along Township Road 320 and follows the south shore of Little Manitou Lake.

Highway 365 crosses Little Manitou Lake at km 10 and shifts onto Range Road 2250. At km 11 it shifts onto Township Road 324, and shifts to Range Road 2252 at km 19, where it continues north. Its northern terminus is at Highway 16 near Plunkett.

Other than Highways 2 and 16, Highway 365 only directly connects with one other Saskatchewan provincial highway, Highway 668 at km 1. However, there is a point near km 10 where Highways 365 and 668 are less than half a kilometre apart, separated by Township Road 320; there is a "TO 668" sign at Highway 365's intersection with Township Road 320.

Major intersections 
From west to east:

References

External links

365